Fannin may refer to:

Geography
Fannin, Kentucky, an unincorporated community
Fannin, Mississippi, a rural community, formerly a town
Fannin, Texas, an unincorporated community
Fannin County, Georgia
Fannin County, Texas
Fannin Battleground State Historic Site, Texas
Camp Fannin, a U.S. Army Infantry Replacement Training Center and prisoner-of-war camp near Tyler, Texas, during World War II
Fanning Springs, Levy County, Florida
Fannin Range, a Canadian mountain range

People
Cliff Fannin (1924–1966), American Major League Baseball pitcher
Eustace Fannin (born 1919), South African retired tennis player, 1947 French Open doubles champion
James Fannin (1804–1836), Texas Army colonel and a leader in the Texas Revolution against Mexico
James R. Fannin (born 1949), American politician
Jody Fannin (born 1993), British auto racing driver
Mario Fannin (born 1987), American football player
Paul Fannin (1907–2002), American businessman and politician, former Senator from and Governor of Arizona